Palermiti is a village and comune of the province of Catanzaro in the Calabria region of southern Italy.

Notes and references

Cities and towns in Calabria